Victoria Pier may refer to:

 Fleetwood Pier
 Rhyl Pier
 Royal Pier, Southampton
 South Pier, Blackpool
 Victoria Pier, Colwyn Bay
 Victoria Pier, Kingston upon Hull